Comanche Moon is a 2008 American television miniseries, an adaptation of the 1997 novel of the same name. Woodrow Call and Gus McCrae are in their middle years, serving as Texas Rangers. In terms of the Lonesome Dove series' storyline, this account serves as a prequel to the Lonesome Dove miniseries, and a sequel to Dead Man's Walk. It first aired on CBS beginning Sunday, January 13, and continuing Tuesday, January 15, and Wednesday, January 16, 2008.

Plot

Part 1
The series starts in The Republic of Texas in the early 19th century with a massacre of Comanche chiefs, observed by a young Buffalo Hump. The opening coda explains that The Texas Rangers "were formed as a volunteer troop to contain the Comanche" and indicates the locale is north-west Texas in 1858. Woodrow Call and Augustus McCrae are among a party of eight men, led by Captain Scull and supported by a Kickapoo scout (Famous Shoes). They seek to capture Kicking Wolf, who is hiding in the camp of Buffalo Hump. Meanwhile, in Austin, Clara Forsythe runs her shop and is visited by Maggie Tilton; the two become closer while waiting for the rangers to return. In the nearby mansion, Inez Scull briefly seduces a young ranger, Jake Spoon.

The tables turn on the Rangers as the Captain's horse is stolen by Kicking Wolf. Scull departs with Famous Shoes to retrieve it, deputizing Call and McCrae to take the party back to Austin. The party comes across a burnt out wagon and are able to rescue a traumatized mother and her young daughters from some Comanche before returning to Austin. Separating from Famous Shoes at a river crossing to the Sierra, Scull then tracks his horse alone towards Yellow Cliffs in northern Mexico, a known slavers den, and finds an injured Kicking Wolf but no horse. Buffalo Hump then plans a combined and perhaps final raid to the ocean for all Comanche. In Austin, having met the governor, McCrae and Forsythe reunite, as do Call and Tilton (who tells Call that she is carrying his child). Meanwhile, Scull is captured by Ahumado's men and put into a wooden cage. Call and McCrae, now confirmed as captains, are then tasked with retrieving Scull just as the Comanche army departs.

Part 2
The show opens with a Comanche attack on Austin. Property losses are extensive, most of the men are killed, and women are raped or taken captive if they are young enough. Learning of this, the Rangers decide to return immediately. Ranger Bill Coleman suffers from his losses and hangs himself. Scull, having survived the cage, is moved to Ahumado's snake-pit while awaiting ransom. Blue Duck falls out with his father, Buffalo Hump, and is exiled, and the camp is devastated by cholera. Also, in Galveston, Clara Forsythe learns of her parents' death and loss of the store in Austin. Bob Allen, a horse-trader from Nebraska, proposes to her.

In Austin, the governor re-issues the order to Call and McCrae to rescue Scull, if they can convince cattle ranchers to provide them the 1000-head ransom on credit. Call tries to come to terms with being a father, while McCrae ponders why Clara chose Allen over him. En route to the ranchers, they have a run-in with some wild cattle before being directed to rancher Dick King and the "town" of Lonesome Dove. Unable to secure the ransom, Call and McCrae set off alone to rescue Scull. Meanwhile, Scull is alive in the snake pit. Ahumado is bitten by a spider and dies en route to a legendary medicine tree. The rest of the camp is abandoned. Scull is rescued and returned to Austin, where he suffers occasional delusions. McCrae loses the love of Clara when she learns of his affair with Inez. Call cannot commit to marrying Maggie and claiming her newborn son, named Newton, as his.

Part 3
Seven years later, in 1865, the American Civil War ends. Call is still single and McCrae is mourning the death of his wife Nellie. Call is blind to Spoon moving in with Maggie (who works at the store). He can neither admit feelings for her or accept his son, even though he regularly has dinner with the pair. Spoon leaves for other opportunities. In Austin, Governor Pease is in charge, but the pending arrival of Union cavalry represents a new phase in the struggle with the Comanche. Rangers are to serve as scouts. In Nebraska, Clara Allen, now a mother of two, hears of Nellie's death and mourns the loss of her own son, too. In Boston, the Sculls are still married.

On the plains, Blue Duck continues to attack and kill settlers. Led by Charles Goodnight, the Rangers and cavalry locate a Comanche camp, and recapture "the Parker girl", now a woman who has assimilated to the Comanche. Heading back to Austin, they meet Clara Allen, who is visiting to sell her family's property. Clara and McCrae rekindle their friendship, and she returns to her family in Nebraska. Maggie begins showing symptoms of TB. At the Comanche camp, Buffalo Hump leaves for good. His brother-in-law relays the news to his nephew, Blue Duck, at his forest hideaway. The Rangers and sheriffs raid the Comanche camp but Blue Duck has already left seeking to kill his father. His death represents the end of an era for the region. Maggie dies of TB, and Newt is taken in by Pearl and Rippley.

Cast
 Val Kilmer as Inish Scull
 Steve Zahn as Augustus "Gus" McCrae
 Karl Urban as Woodrow F. Call
 Linda Cardellini as Clara Forsythe Allen
 Elizabeth Banks as Maggie Tilton
 Ryan Merriman as Jake Spoon
 Ray McKinnon as Bill Coleman
 Keith Robinson as Joshua Deets
 Wes Studi as Chief Buffalo Hump
 Adam Beach as Blue Duck
 James Rebhorn as Governor Elisha Pease
 Jake Busey as Tudwal
 Melanie Lynskey as Pearl Coleman
 Sal Lopez as Ahumado
 Norbert Leo Butz as Captain Richard King
 Indira Varma as Therese Wanz
 Floyd Westerman as First Old Comanche
 Kristine Sutherland as Elmira Forsythe
 Rachel Griffiths as Inez Scull
 David Midthunder as Famous Shoes 
 Toby Metcalf as Ranger Lee Hitch
 Troy Baker as "Pea Eye" Parker
 Jeremy Ratchford as Charles Goodnight
 Brad Johnson as Colonel Tom Soult
 Rod Rondeaux as SlowTree

Production
As with others in the Lonesome Dove series, the teleplay was co-written by author Larry McMurtry and Diana Ossana. It was directed by Simon Wincer, with the music directed by Lennie Niehaus.

Historical accuracy
Events such as the shooting of the chieftains (ahistorical, but based on the Council House Fight), the attack on Austin (ahistorical, but based on the Great Raid of 1840), and the rescue of the white woman (historical, based on Cynthia Ann Parker) were all included in the series, although actual timelines or events were altered.

Reception
The series received generally negative reviews from critics. Common complaints were the clownish portrayal of the Texas Rangers, who were continually drunk on duty and tumbling into bed with beautiful women under the slightest pretext, the negative stereotyping of the Mexican characters, who were largely portrayed as unwashed wild-eyed drooling killers superstitiously worshiping long-vanished Aztec gods, and the simplistic portrayal of frontier women, who were either weak-willed, simpering victims or cruel and manipulative Gorgons. Brian Lowry from Variety called it "tedious, at times cartoonishly bad".

Home media
It was released in Region 1 on DVD on February 26, 2008.

References

External links
 
 

2000s American television miniseries
Fiction set in 1858
Fiction set in 1865
Television series set in the 1850s
Television series set in the 1860s
Films directed by Simon Wincer
Films set in Texas
2000s Western (genre) television series
Lonesome Dove series
Television series about the Texas Ranger Division
Television series by Sony Pictures Television
Television series by CBS Studios